Law enforcement in Germany is constitutionally vested solely with the states, which is one of the main features of the German political system.

Policing has always been a responsibility of the German states even after 1871 when the country was unified. The 1919 constitution of the Weimar Republic did provide for the possibility of creating a national police force, should the necessity arise, but it was only in the Nazi era that state police forces were unified under central control and a national police force created (the Reich Security Main Office—Reichssicherheitshauptamt, or RSHA). The police became a tool of the centralized state and the Nazi party.
Following the defeat of 1945, Germany was divided; in 1949 the three western zones were turned into the new West Germany, while the Soviet zone became East Germany. Each country pursued a different path concerning law enforcement.

In light of the gross misuse of power by the centralized Nazi state, the new West German constitution provided a strict separation of powers, placing law enforcement firmly in the hands of the states. The only policing agencies allowed at the federal level were the paramilitary Federal Border Guard (German: Bundesgrenzschutz), also responsible for coast guard services, and the Federal Criminal Police, both under the supervision of the Federal Ministry of the Interior. East Germany created a centralized police force under the Ministry of the Interior, the paramilitary Volkspolizei (literally "People's Police"). It also established a border police force (German: Grenztruppen der DDR), initially an independent force, later integrated into the army and then reorganized as an independent military organization. Because Germany's borders became largely open in 2005, due to the development of the European Union and spread of the Schengen Agreement to all neighbouring countries, the Bundesgrenzschutz was renamed to Federal Police (German: Bundespolizei). The duties of the Federal Police still are limited to the security of railway lines, main railway stations, airports, sea ports, and several other special duties.

Federal agencies

Federal Criminal Police Office

Another central police agency, the Federal Criminal Police Office (German: Bundeskriminalamt / BKA), with approximately 7,100 agents, operates nationwide from headquarters in Wiesbaden. The BKA is a clearinghouse for criminal intelligence records.

It provides assistance to the State Criminal Police Offices (German: Landeskriminalamt / LKA) in forensic matters, research, and criminal investigations. It is also the national point of contact for the International Criminal Police Organization (Interpol). 
The BKA conducts own criminal investigations or enters existing cases only when requested by state authorities, or in cases involving two or more states. The BKA has been involved in investigations against various terrorist groups since the 1960s.

Federal Customs Service
The Federal Customs Service (German: Bundeszollverwaltung) is the executive and fiscal administrative agency of the Federal Ministry of Finance. It was founded in 1949 in West Germany. The purpose of the Customs Service is to administer federal taxes, execute demands for payment on behalf of the federal government and federal statutory corporations, monitor the cross border movements of goods with regard to compliance with bans and restrictions, and prevent illicit work. Uniformed federal agents are used for the execution of the financial legislation. Subordinated to the federal customs service, the Customs Investigation Bureau in Cologne (German: Zollkriminalamt / ZKA) coordinates customs investigations nationwide in particular monitoring foreign trade, uncovering violations of EU market regulations, illegal technology exports, subsidy fraud in the agricultural sector, drug trafficking and money laundering. In response to the increasing violence against law enforcement officers, the customs SWAT team, the Central Customs Support Group (German: Zentrale Unterstützungsgruppe Zoll / ZUZ) was implemented in 1997 as the customs tactical unit for dangerous missions.

Federal Intelligence Service
The  Federal Intelligence Service (German: Bundesnachrichtendienst / BND) was based in Munich. Since February 2019, the Service is based in Berlin. The BND is restricted to the investigation of threats originating outside of Germany. It depends heavily on wiretapping and other surveillance techniques applied to international communications. Such activities are authorized only to counter the danger of an armed threat to the country, but intelligence authorities have pressed for the added power to monitor suspected international traffickers of weapons and drugs.

Federal Office for the Protection of the Constitution
The Federal Office for the Protection of the Constitution (German: Bundesamt für Verfassungsschutz / BfV) is primarily the domestic intelligence service of Germany, concerned with espionage, treason, and sedition. It has no powers of arrest and cannot use force, but it carries out surveillance and supplies the BKA and other police agencies with information e.g. on terrorist groups. Its main office is in Wiesbaden. Similar and independent offices exist in each state. Although they cooperate closely with the federal office, they operate under the control of state authorities.

Federal Police

Established in 1951, the Bundespolizei (BPOL) is the uniformed federal police force. It is subordinated to the Federal Ministry of the Interior (Bundesministerium des Innern (BMI)). The Bundespolizei was previously known as the Bundesgrenzschutz (BGS) ("Federal Border Guard") and had a more restricted role until July 1, 2005 when the law renaming the BGS as the BPOL was enacted.

All personnel on duty carry sidearms. Some units have light aircraft and helicopters to facilitate rapid access to remote border areas and for patrol and rescue missions. A coast guard force forms a part of the BPOL. It is equipped with 14 large patrol craft and several helicopters.

In addition to controlling Germany's border, the BPOL serves as a federal reserve force to deal with major disturbances and other emergencies beyond the scope of Land police. The BPOL guards airports and foreign embassies, and several highly trained detachments are available for special crisis situations requiring demolition equipment, helicopters, or combat vehicles. After shortcomings in police procedures and training were revealed by the terrorist attack on Israeli athletes at the 1972 Olympics, a task force known as Border Guard Group 9 (GSG-9) was formed to deal with terrorist incidents, especially hostage situations. The GSG-9 won world attention when it rescued 86 passengers on a Lufthansa airliner hijacked to Mogadishu, Somalia, in 1977.

A military rank structure similar to that of the Bundeswehr was replaced in the mid-1970s by civil service-type personnel grades. The service uniform was green but has been changed to blue.

The West German Railway Police (Bahnpolizei), formerly an independent force, and the East German Transportpolizei were restructured under the BGS to form the Bundespolizei in 1990.

Military police

The Feldjäger are responsible for carrying out military law in Germany. It was formed in October 1955. They have no power over civilians.

State agencies

State Criminal Investigation Office

The State Criminal Police Office (German: Landeskriminalamt / LKA), is an independent law enforcement agency in most German states, that is directly subordinated to the respective state ministry of the interior. The LKA supervises police operations aimed at preventing and investigating criminal offences and coordinates investigations of serious crime, involving more than one regional headquarter. They can take over investigative responsibility in cases of serious crime, e.g. drug trafficking, organized crime, environmental and white-collar crime or extremist and terrorist offences. Each Landeskriminalamt is also a modern central office for information, analyzing police intelligence from home and abroad and transmitting it to police stations. It collates data on criminal offences and offenders in crime statistics that are used as a basis for new strategies, policy decisions and legislative initiatives. It also analyzes certain offense areas, evaluates the police measures executed in each case, forecasts expected tendencies and describes events in annual reports.

State Offices for the Protection of the Constitution
The State Office for the Protection of the Constitution (German: Landesamt für Verfassungsschutz / lfV) in every single state, is the domestic intelligence service, concerned with espionage, treason, and sedition. Due to the negative experiences of abusing power in Nazi-Germany, the domestic intelligence duties are not centralized and therefore maintained by the states. As the BfV, the LfV have no powers of arrest and cannot use force, but it carries out surveillance and supplies police agencies with information on opposition parties, international crime, drug trafficking, terrorism, and other illegal activities.

State Police Forces

The German states are responsible for managing the bulk of Germany's police forces. Each state has its own police force known as the State Police (German: Landespolizei). Each state promulgates a law which lays down the organisation and duties of its police (Landespolizeigesetz or Sicherheits- und Ordnungsgesetz).

Although the state police forces are regulated by sixteen different legislatures and are, in fact, different police forces, there has been an increasing tendency toward standardization of police activities nationwide. Concerns about terrorism and the growth of organized crime have strengthened the movement to centralize police procedures and operations. The idea of creating one single police code for the whole of Germany (allgemeines Polizeigesetz) came up in the 1960s but never passed.

These forces are organized by cities, towns, or rural communities, but all are integral components of the police forces of the state in which they are located. The respective state minister of interior supervises police operations in his or her jurisdiction. Although the internal organizations differ somewhat, all state police are divided into the Protective Police (German: Schutzpolizei / SchuPo), a uniformed service carrying out routine law and order duties, and Criminal Police Office (German: Kriminalpolizei / almost always abbreviated with KriPo), who carry out criminal investigations. The separate Administrative Police formerly had duties that included the registration of residents and the issuance of passports, identity cards, and various permits. These functions have been transferred to civil state government departments (Einwohnermeldeamt—Resident registration office) in all states.

The uniforms and vehicle colour schemes of the state police forces are different, but somewhat similar all over Germany, the state police forces are structured differently in each state as well. For example, in some states the Kripo can be part of the ordinary police force, in some states it is organized separately.

The idea of using the same colour for police uniforms and vehicles throughout the European Union has been realized in all German state police forces and the federal police. All vehicle liveries and uniforms changed from white/green to silver/blue until 2018. The basic silver colour for vehicles in the most states, is actually increasing the resale value and thus lowers leasing costs. The uniforms already have been changed by all state police forces and the federal police from the green/beige version introduced in 1979 to blue ones. Hamburg was the first state to make the transition, Bavaria the last state, finishing the replacement of the green/beige uniforms in 2018.

Auxiliary State Police Forces 
Some German states maintain auxiliary police forces under different denominations, depending on the state's legislation. In most auxiliary forces, the officers are armed with pepper spray, in some forces with the regular equipment of professional police officers. Some states maintain a "Voluntary Police Service" (German: Freiwilliger Polizeidienst) like Baden-Württemberg and  Hesse, some a "Security Watch" (German: Sicherheitswacht), like Bavaria and Saxony, and only Brandenburg offers a "Security Partner" (German: Sicherheitspartner) program.

Their main duty is crime prevention by: 
 conducting walking patrols to deter street crime
 patrolling near schools and kindergartens
 maintaining contact with potential victims of crime and juvenile delinquents.

Bavaria has instituted a system of citizen patrols (Sicherheitswacht) in which unarmed teams of two volunteers patrol assigned areas to improve subjective security. These teams carry a radio to call for help if necessary and a pepper spray for protection. A white armband with black letters identifying them as a "Security Watch" patrol.

Citizens in Baden-Württemberg can participate in the volunteer police programme, where roughly 1,200 citizens voluntarily assist their local police in 20 towns. These volunteers are specially trained, wear regular uniforms and are sworn and armed with normal police gear.

Citizens in Hesse and Saxony can also participate in a Volunteer Police program, where some citizens voluntarily assist their local police. The volunteers are trained for 50 hours in Hesse and 60 hours in Saxony, receive uniforms, pepper spray and a mobile phone in Hesse and a radio in Saxony.

In Brandenburg there were established about 200 security partners along the Polish border as well as around Greater Berlin. The legal basis is a decree of the State Minister of the Interior of 11 October 1995.

People can also join on a full-time basis the Wachpolizei, which has less authority (and less pay) than regular police officers to perform basic police tasks, like the guarding of premisses like an embassy, to release regular officers for patrol work.

Local agencies

Municipal order enforcement agencies 

In Germany municipal code enforcement is organized very heterogeneously, depending on state, county and municipal regulations. Currently, many cities in Germany maintain local order enforcement agencies, with limited police-type duties. Those bylaw enforcement officers in general are city employees. Contingent on the respective unit, the officers wear - usually police like - uniforms or wear plain clothes with an armband or a labeled jacket, they could be armed or unarmed. The order enforcement officers are the municipal administration's "eyes and ears on the street". Mostly they are charged with monitoring municipal by-laws and laws that fall under the responsibility of municipalities, which include monitoring the conduct of shop owners, sanitation inspections, veterinary inspections and minor infractions and misdemeanors such as illegal parking, littering, state and local dog regulations etc. They usually only hand out warnings and fines and can only perform a citizen's arrest as any other citizen can. If they see any major crimes they are required to call the state police for a criminal investigation, while they can intervene in ongoing crimes themselves.

Even the denominations are manifold, depending on local regulations as well, most of the time the denominations are:
 Municipal Code Enforcement Service
 Community Enforcement Service
 Order Enforcement Office, most common denomination
 Municipal Enforcement Service
 Municipal Guard / Municipal Watch

Municipal police forces 

In Baden-Württemberg municipal police officers do have the same rights, powers and obligations like the counterparts of the state police. The tasks of a municipal police force depend on the size of the municipality's territory and the number of inhabitants in which it is operating. The "police authority" of a town or city can transfer more tasks and responsibilities to its police force, only if approved by the regional government of the state.

In the state of Hesse, city police forces provide the local order enforcement. The officers wear police uniforms and are armed. Similar to the municipal order enforcement units, there are different denominations:
 City Police
 Community Police

Training 

Police training is primarily the responsibility of the individual states, although the federal government provides assistance and coordination. The high level of police professionalism is attributed in large degree to the length and thoroughness of training. The situation is different in the five new states of eastern Germany. Long accustomed to a society made compliant by eliminating opposing opinions, police forces of the eastern states have to adapt to the growing numbers of opposing right-wing groups and factions.

Most police recruits spend about two and a half years in the regular police academy training. The auxiliary police forces, with fewer powers and often not equipped with a duty-weapon, are trained in just 12 weeks. In case of higher education, recruits can also start off at a higher rank, comparable to Lieutenant, which they have to attend police college for and acquire a bachelor's degree.

After about six years of duty as a patrol officer, an individual with an outstanding record who does well on a highly competitive examination and started off in the regular police academy can go on to two or three years at a higher police school or a college of public administration to qualify for a bachelor's degree. The very few candidates who qualify for the highest ranks of the police study for one year at the Federal Police Leadership Academy in Münster-Hiltrup.

Off duty carry
Depending on the certain state police regulation, German police officers may be authorized to carry their department-issued firearms while off duty. Some states allow their officers to apply for the approval to purchase a private firearm, that can be carried off-duty. Further restrictions that forbid off-duty carry exist (i.e. when drinking alcohol, at public events). In their private properties, the officers are required to have a safe to store their gun while not carrying it.

Women in the Police
The state police forces have had female members since the implementation of the several police forces after World War II. Initially, female officers were assigned to cases involving juveniles and women, working in plainclothes without weapons. Since the mid-1970s, female police officers have performed general police patrol duties and their proportion of total police officers is steadily rising. However, their representation in leadership positions is still relatively low.

Alert Police
The Alert Police, literally "Readiness or Standby Police" is available in each state for riot control, although their primary function is training police recruits. In this tasks it is comparable with Anti-Riot Police Forces in other countries. While the states are free to choose the equipment and to organize their police forces autonomously, the state and federal alert police units receive standardized weapons, vehicles, anti-riot gears and communications equipment from the federal government by law. An office in the Federal Ministry of Interior monitors and coordinates the deployment of the  units, which can be called upon to assist the police of other states in case of riots or other civil unrest.

The Alert Police is assigned to barracks where they are organized along military lines into squads, platoons, and 120- to 150-member training or standby companies. In most states, the  contingents consists of one 600- to 800-member battalion, but in six of the larger states they are organized into regiments.

Duties vary according to local requirements. In Hamburg, for example, the  patrol the subway system, assist in police raids in the red-light district, and are present at large demonstrations and soccer matches. Their units are equipped with their own transport, tents, and rations, enabling them to be shifted quickly to other  without having to rely on outside support. The Readiness Police have water cannons and armoured vehicles but are armed with lighter weapons than those of the federal police.

All state alert police forces and the federal alert police force maintain specialized units as well, the so-called Arrest Units (lit. "Units for arrests and securing evidence", abbreviated BFE). The BFE units were established in 1987 after two police officers were killed during demonstrations against the expansion of Frankfurt Airport.

As a reaction to several terrorist attacks in Europe since 2015, an additional unit, the BFE+, was implemented in summer 2015. The BFE+ should provide specialized operators for long lasting (search) operations for example after a terrorist attack.

Career brackets 
In general, the German law enforcement authorities of today have personnel of three available career brackets, the lowest being the "" ("middle service"), followed by the so-called "" ("elevated service") and the "" ("higher service"). Only the Federal Customs Administration (Bundeszollverwaltung) and the Departments of Justice and Corrections of the states ( — Justice Enforcement Service) still have personnel of the very lowest career bracket "" ("simple service"). To understand this structure it may be helpful to compare it with military rank structures because decades ago it was really similar.

Development of career 
Today nine of sixteen State Police Forces recruit only for the career bracket of the "".

Entry into "" requires successful completion of 10 years of schooling, or a successful training in any other job and some years of working in this job. In the mid to late seventies the "" was disestablished for the detective branch , but in some states of the former GDR, they still exist. Rank designation, in this case, f.e. .

Entry into the "" requires a high-school diploma and period of training is 3 years at a college of administration and justice.

The third career bracket is the so-called "". A direct entry into this career bracket is possible and requires a law degree of a university, but the majority of these officers had started their career in "" or "". That is the only official centralised educational institution of the German police. Starting at the rank of "" or "" (literally "police counsellor" or "detective counsellor") up to "" ("police president"), which is (in most German states) equivalent to the rank of Chief of Police in the USA.

Judiciary

The German legal system is a civil law mostly based on a comprehensive compendium of statutes, as compared to the common law systems. The  (Federal Constitutional Court, being located in the city of Karlsruhe) is the German supreme court responsible for constitutional matters, with power of judicial review. Germany's supreme court system, called  ("Supreme Federal Courts of Justice"), is specialised: for civil and criminal cases, the highest court of appeal is the inquisitorial Federal Court of Justice ("" in Karlsruhe) and for other affairs the courts are the Federal Labour Court ("" in Erfurt), the Federal Social Court ("Bundessozialgericht" in Kassel), the Federal Fiscal Court ("" in Munich) and the Federal Administrative Court ("" in Leipzig). The  (International Penal Law Code) regulates the consequences of crimes against humanity, genocide and war crimes, and gives German courts universal jurisdiction under specific circumstances.

The German penal system is aimed towards rehabilitation of the criminal and the protection of the general public. Except for petty crimes, which are tried before a single professional judge, and serious political crimes, all charges are tried before mixed tribunals on which lay judges ( or assessors) sit side by side with professional judges.

Equipment

Vehicles

German police typically use cars from German manufacturers. Mercedes-Benz, Volkswagen, Audi, Opel and BMW are commonly used as patrol cars (Streifenwagen). States used to prefer vehicles built in or close to the respective state. However, with most states now leasing instead of buying their vehicles and in light of European Union rules on contract bidding, states have less latitude in choosing which manufacturer will provide their patrol cars than they did.

In the Saarland which is historically closely tied to neighboring France, vehicles from French companies as well as European Fords are used as police cars. The Bavarian State Police uses mainly BMW and Audi vehicles, as both companies are based in Bavaria (BMW in Munich and Audi in Ingolstadt). In the eastern states of Germany, mostly Volkswagens are in use (Volkswagen is based in Wolfsburg, close to the eastern states). The Hessian police prefer Opel cars (the Opel brand formerly belonged to General Motors, currently it is owned by PSA, which is a part of Stellantis) is based in Rüsselsheim near Frankfurt am Main in Hesse). Baden-Württemberg mostly uses Mercedes-Benz and Volkswagen cars for their police force.

Before the police reform in the mid-1970s, Germany had many city police forces and each had its own police car livery. Dark blue, dark green and white were popular colours. However, the dark colours were perceived as a disadvantage as many accidents occurred at night during high-speed chases. Therefore, the conference of interior ministers decided on standardising police car liveries so that the cars appeared non-threatening and could be easily visible at night. Bright green and white became the colours associated with police vehicles in Germany beginning in the 1970s. More recently, police forces changed to silver cars and vans instead of white ones as they were easier to sell than the white ones when their police service was over. In an effort to harmonize the coloring of police in Europe, Germany has adopted a blue-silver livery with the addition of neon reflective surfaces to increase visibility.

Today, German police forces generally lease patrol cars from a manufacturer, usually for a period of three years. The leasing company marks the patrol cars using plastic foils with reflecting strips as borders instead of painting them. The foils are removed when the cars are sold to the public as standard silver used cars when the lease runs out.

Unlike in other countries like the United States, police cars in Germany rarely come with any special equipment (apart from the obvious, like flashing lights or sirens) not available to other users of the same model, as the cars on sale in European markets are generally considered to be fit for police duty without any further alteration.

Type of vehicles
These vehicles are used by law enforcement agencies in Germany:

Uniforms

History
From 1945 onwards, due to the multilayer organisation in municipal and rural state law enforcement agencies, German police forces wore completely different colored uniforms. In the mid-seventies the aftermath of Munich massacre a reorganisation of the state police forces took place. This opportunity was taken to implement a standard police uniform for all West German states and West Berlin. All state police forces implemented the same green and beige uniform, most parts designed by Heinz Oestergaard. The standard uniform consisted of a tunic, parka, pullover without shroud, coat, visor cap and necktie in moss-green, trouser, pullover and cardigan in brown-beige, shirt (long and short sleeve) in bamboo-yellow. Shoes, boots, holsters, leather jackets and other leather gear were black. Leather gloves were olive-drab. There were some exceptions. Visor caps with a white top were worn by the traffic police and by the Schutzpolizei during traffic regulation duties.

The state river or water police forces (German: Wasserschutzpolizei) wore uniforms of a completely different design. The basic uniform was navy-blue, the shirt was white and the visor cap had a white top. The BGS wore an all forest green uniform with a bamboo-yellow shirt. After German Reunification the Volkspolizei was broken up into Landespolizei and switched to the standard uniform. During the period of transition, they still wore their old uniforms but with Western-style sleeve and cap ensigns.

Transition to blue uniforms of state and federal police units
Like most European countries have blue police uniforms, all German State Police Forces (German: Landespolizei) and the Federal Police (German: Bundespolizei) have shifted to blue uniforms to conform with the common blue image of most police forces in Europe. In line with the uniforms, police vehicles and various items of equipment also changed the color to blue. Although there are 16 states, currently only six types of state police uniforms are in use, because many states co-operate in the design and sourcing of the police uniforms.
State level

Federal level

See also
 List of law enforcement agencies in Germany
 Police forces of Nazi Germany
 Zollkriminalamt (German Customs Investigation Bureau)
 Staatsanwaltschaft (public prosecutor's office)
 Crime in Germany
 Prisons in Germany
 List of killings by law enforcement officers in Germany
 Legal aid in Germany

References